The King of Miami (2007–2008) was a reality comedy TV show that tracked the adventures of comedian Dave Hill and his sidekick (Phil Costello) as they try to establish themselves as big-name celebrities in Miami, Florida. Despite having dubious credentials and being from Cleveland, Ohio, Hill adopts the moniker “The King of Miami” and begins acquiring the accoutrements and buzz of a famous Miamian.

The King of Miami ran for one season. The show aired on the MOJO HD network. It is also currently airing on Film24 in the United Kingdom.

External links
King of Miami (MOJO HD)

2000s American reality television series
2007 American television series debuts
2008 American television series endings
Television shows set in Miami